"Je veux" ("I want") is a song by French singer Zaz from her debut studio album Zaz (2010). The song also became her debut single.

Writing and composition 
The song was written by Kerredine Soltani and Tryss. The recording was produced by Kerredine Soltani and Alban Sautour

Track listing 
Promo digital single (2010) – Play On (Sony)
 "Je veux" (3:37)

CD single (2011) – Play On (Sony)
 "Je veux" (3:38)
 "Je veux" (Live & Unplugged) (3:47)

Charts

Certifications

References 

2010 songs
2010 singles
Zaz (singer) songs
French songs
Sony Music singles